The stone lion of Hamadan ( šir-e sangi-ye hamedân) is a historical monument in Hamadan, Iran.

The stone lion – one part of the 'Lions' Gate' – sits on a hill where a Parthian-era cemetery is said to have been located.

When first built, this statue had a twin counterpart for which they both constituted the old gate of the city. During the Islamic conquest of Persia, the victorious Arabs referred to the gate as bâb ul-asad ("the lions' gate").

The gates were demolished in 931AD as the Deylamids took over the city.

Mardāvij unsuccessfully tried transporting one of the lions to Ray. Angered by the failure to move them, he ordered them to be demolished. One lion was completely destroyed, while the other had its arm broken and pulled to the ground. The half-demolished lion lay on its side on the ground until 1949, when it was raised again, using a supplemental arm that was built into it.

In 1968 Heinz Luschey demonstrated that the lion is a Hellenistic sculpture and that the lion monument at Chaeronea (erected in 338 BC) is comparable. His interpretation that it was built by the orders of Alexander the Great to commemorate the death of his close companion Hephaestion in 324 BC. is adopted by Iran's Cultural Heritage Organization.

References

General references
Luschey, H. Der Löwe von Ekbtana, Archäologische Mitteilungen aus Iran 1, 1968, 115-129
Simaye Miras-i Farhangi-i Hamedan, Iran Cultural Heritage Organization, 2003
Fox, R. L. Alexander the Great (Page Number: 434), Penguin Books, London

Sculptures of lions
Outdoor sculptures in Iran
Buildings and structures in Hamadan Province
Tourist attractions in Hamadan Province

National works of Iran